Petter Belsvik (born 2 October 1967) is a Norwegian football coach and former player, who played as a striker. With 159 goals in the Norwegian Premier League he ranks third in the all-time goalscorer statistics, behind Harald Brattbakk. He never appeared for the Norwegian national team.

Playing career
Belsvik is a so-called journeyman footballer, with spells in many clubs. He started his career in Faaberg, and played top league football for Molde, HamKam, Start, Stabæk, Rosenborg, Vålerenga and Lillestrøm. At the end of his career as a footballer he also had a short stay at the Norwegian amateur side Heming.

His impact on football abroad has been limited, with only short spells in Southend United, AaB and Austria Vienna. Belsvik also had an unsuccessful trial at Sunderland AFC

Managing career
After finishing his playing career he was hired as an assistant coach in Stabæk. After Stabæk won the league in 2008, Belsvik became an assistant for Lillestrøm in 2009, taking briefly over as caretaker head coach in 2011.

Belsvik signed for Stabæk as head coach ahead of the 2012 season. He steered the club to relegation from the 2012 Tippeligaen, but then instant re-promotion from the 2013 Adeccoligaen. After the season, he left the position as head coach.

Ahead of the 2014 season he changed club to Fram Larvik.

Honours
He became cup champion with Stabæk in 1998 and league champion with Rosenborg in 2000.

References

 AaB profile
 Rosenborg profile
 Austria Vienna profile

1967 births
Living people
Sportspeople from Lillehammer
Norwegian footballers
Molde FK players
Hamarkameratene players
IK Start players
AaB Fodbold players
Southend United F.C. players
Stabæk Fotball players
FK Austria Wien players
Rosenborg BK players
Vålerenga Fotball players
Lillestrøm SK players
Eliteserien players
Danish Superliga players
Austrian Football Bundesliga players
Expatriate men's footballers in Denmark
Expatriate footballers in England
Expatriate footballers in Austria
Norwegian expatriate sportspeople in Denmark
Norwegian expatriate sportspeople in England
Norwegian expatriate sportspeople in Austria
Norwegian expatriate footballers
Norwegian football managers
Lillestrøm SK managers
Stabæk Fotball managers
IF Fram Larvik managers
Association football forwards
Eliteserien managers